The American Society of Brewing Chemists (ASBC) is a professional organization of scientists and technical professionals in the brewing, malting, and allied industries. It publishes an journal, the Journal of the American Society of Brewing Chemists.

External links
ASBC Website

Beer organizations
Chemistry societies